Hymenolepis indivisa is a species of plant endemic to South Africa.

Description 
The stem splits into a few sparse branches from about halfway up the plant. The small thread-like leaves roll outward and downward. 

The yellow or golden-brown flowers are present between September and November. They are found clustered in round inflorescences. The stems bearing the flowers are clearly visible and the bracts are hairless.

Distribution and habitat 
This plant is endemic to the Eastern Cape of South Africa. It grows on sandstone slopes, mountain tops, grassland next to dams and in disturbed areas.

References 

Flora of South Africa
Plants described in 1986
Anthemideae